George Frederic Stewart Bowles (17 November 1877 – 1 January 1955) was a British Conservative Party politician and barrister.

Bowles was born 17 November 1877, the son of Thomas Gibson Bowles of London. He was educated at Farnborough School, Hants. before entering the Royal Navy in 1891; resigned Commission, 1897 and went to Cambridge University where he graduated BA in 1901 and MA in 1905. He was admitted to the Inner Temple in 1898, and called to the Bar in 1901 whereupon he practised in the Admiralty Court for a few years.

He married Madeline Mary Tobin (born in 1893 at Hanover Square, Westminster) in 1922. They had 2 children.

He was the Member of Parliament (MP)  for Norwood from 1906 to 1910. He attended Trinity College, Cambridge. He was the son of Tommy Bowles, an MP and the founder of the magazines The Lady and the English Vanity Fair.

Bowles died in Malta on 1 January 1955.

References

External links 

 

1877 births
1955 deaths
UK MPs 1906–1910
Conservative Party (UK) MPs for English constituencies
Alumni of Trinity College, Cambridge